Versmann is a surname. Notable people with the surname include:

  (1814–1873), German theologian
 Johannes Versmann (1820–1899), German lawyer and politician